How to Fake It in America is an album by Bendik Brænne. The album won the Spellemannsprisen (Norwegian Grammy Awards) in 2013 for best country album.

Track listing 
 "Still Too Small"
 "Curtis Came to Stay"
 "Northern Sky"
 "Hey Gillian!"
 "Never Seen a Brighter Shade"
 "Big White House"
 "Orange St."
 "Chuck Wagon Rag"
 "Turn My Way" (Featuring Bobby Keys)

Personnel

Andy Hall - dobro
Bobby Keys - saxophone
Bryan Owings - drums
Fats Kaplin - lap Steel, mandolin, fiddle
Rob McNelley - guitar
Steven Sheehan - acoustic guitar
Tim Marks - electric and upright bass
Amund Maarud - guitar, engineer
Bendik Brænne - vocals, piano, saxophone, engineer 
Eivind Solheim - trumpet
Hans F. Friis - trombone, backup vocals
Jakob Jones - backup vocals
Lars Oskarsen - backup vocals
Lars Erik Larsen - backup vocals, bass

Lasse Hafreager - organ
Magnus Tveten - backup vocals
Morten Krogh Hagen - double bass
Tuva Andersen - vocals
Øystein Frantzvåg - backup vocals, mixer
Eivind H. Natvig -  photographer
Stefan C. Wold - cover design
Erick Jaskowiak - engineer
Brett Lind - assistand engineer
Vegard K. Sleipnes - engineer
Johnny Skalleberg - mixer
Henrik Maarud - mixer
Bryan Lucey - mastering

References
http://ninebullets.net/archives/bendik-braenne-how-to-fake-it-in-america

2013 albums
Bendik Brænne albums